William Lyell (born August 10, 1984) is an American former professional boxer who competed from 2003 to 2013. He challenged for the IBF middleweight title in 2010.

Amateur career
In an interview with Peter Czymbor, Lyell stated that he had an amateur record of "about 35-20" in "about 50-55 amateur bouts".

Professional career
In February 2009, Lyell upset an undefeated John Duddy in a ten round fight by split decision.

IBF Middleweight Championship
He then lost a very tough fight to Sebastian Sylvester.

WBC Silver Middleweight Championship
On June 5, 2010 Billy lost to undefeated champion Julio César Chávez, Jr. The bout was held at the Estadio Banorte in Culiacán, Mexico.

References

External links

Boxers from Ohio
Middleweight boxers
1984 births
Living people
People from Niles, Ohio
American male boxers